Katie Salmon may refer to:

Katie Salmon (basketball), played in 2015–16 Loyola Ramblers women's basketball team
Katie Salmon (glamour model)